John Robichaux (1866–1939) was an American jazz bandleader, drummer, and violinist. He was the uncle of Joseph Robichaux.

Career 
He was born in Thibodaux, Louisiana, United States, on January 16, 1866. John Robichaux moved to New Orleans, Louisiana in 1891, where he was the bass drummer for the Excelsior Brass Band from 1892 to 1903. During this time he also worked as a bandleader, playing violin in his own ensembles from 1893 until the time of his death. Among the ensembles he led was a 36-piece orchestra in 1913. Robichaux's bands were highly respected in his day and included many of the city's best musicians, such as Bud Scott, Lorenzo Tio, and Manuel Perez. He wrote over 350 songs and wrote many orchestral arrangements, which are now kept at the William Ransom Hogan Jazz Archive located at Tulane University.

Personal life 
Robichaux was raised Catholic.

References

Further reading

External links

1866 births
1939 deaths
American jazz bandleaders
American jazz violinists
American male violinists
Jazz musicians from New Orleans
People from Thibodaux, Louisiana
American male jazz musicians
Excelsior Brass Band members

African-American Catholics